The Accused Escaped (Persian: متهم گریخت‎, romanized: Motaham Gorikht) is an Iranian comedy-drama television series directed by Reza Attaran and written by Saeed Aghakhani, which aired on IRIB TV3 from 3 October to 4 November 2005 for 26 episodes. the series aired during Ramadan. The series centers on Hashem, who migrates to Tehran with his family because of a heart problem, his wife's insistence, and the hope of a better job. But living in Tehran puts him and his family in a lot of trouble.

In April 2021, after 15 years of the series airing, IRIB TV3 broadcast it again and it was one of the most-watched television series of the year, becoming one of the most popular television series of all time in Iran.

Plot 
Hashem (Sirus Gorjestani) and his family live a simple life in a city not far away. Prior to his illness, he worked as an exhaust repairman in a rented shop, but doctors prevented him from doing heavy work due to his illness. For this reason, they decide to move to Tehran. Upon arrival in Tehran, Hashem and his family face many problems that...

Cast and characters

Main 

 Sirus Gorjestani as Hashem Agha Babazadeh
 Maryam Amir Jalali as Sarvar Khanoom, Hashem's wife
 Ali Sadeghi as Abbas, Masoumeh's husband and Hashem's son-in-law
 Saeed Aghakhani as Mansour, in love with Azam
 Mahmoud Bahrami as Shazdeh, Hashem's Landlord, in love with Bibi
 Shahrbanoo Mousavi as Bibi, Hashem's mom, Sarvar's Mother-in-law
 Melika Zarei as Masoumeh, Hashem's youngest daughter and Abbas's Wife
 Lida Fatholahi as Azam, Hashem's eldest daughter
 Alireza Jafari as Saeed, Hashem's son

Recurring 

 Reza Attaran as Ramin
 Ahmad Pourmokhber as Mashghorboun, Hashem's Neighbor, in love with Bibi
 Majid Shahriari as Ashki, Hashem's boss and creditor
 Khashayar Rad as Nader blourian
 Felor Nazari as Nader's wife
 Reza Davood Nejad as the man in front of the Hospital
 Asghar heidari as Touraj, Criminal and Hashem's Classmate
 Anahita Afshar as Ramin's wife
 Mohammad Barsouzian as the head of the Hospital
 Afshin Sangchap as the driver that Saeed brought

Ambiguities about the writer of the series 
In one of the episodes of the Haft TV program, it was said that the is script of the TV series "Khaneh be Dosh" and the plot of the TV series "The Accused Escaped" from Asghar Farhadi. In a program on Channel Shoma, Maryam Amir Jalali raised this issue again and said that the main writer of this series and the series "Khaneh be Dosh" was Asghar Farhadi, but at that time, because he wanted to be mentioned only in cinematic works, He preferred not to have his name in the serial titration! Shortly afterwards, Saeed Aghakhani announced on the same program on Channel Shoma that the writers of both series are the same ones whose names are mentioned in the credits and that Ms. Amir Jalali spoke because of her lack of nobility in the whole subject.

Reception

Awards and nominations

References 

 Death of seven actors of the accused escaped series

External links
 

Iranian comedy television series
2005 Iranian television series debuts
Iranian drama television series
Islamic Republic of Iran Broadcasting original programming